Pastel is the art medium.

Pastel may also refer to:
 Pastel (color), color family 
 Pastel (food), pastries 
 "Pastel", an instrumental track by saxophonist Kenny G from his 1988 album Silhouette
 Pastel (manga), comic 
 Pastel (programming language) extended version of Pascal
 Pastel (Twinbee), fictional character in video game
 Pastel Accounting, South African accounting software
 Pastel Memories, Japanese video game and anime series
 Pastel QAnon, Sub-community of QAnon followers

People with the surname Pastel
Grégory Pastel (born 1991), professional footballer

See also
 The Pastels, band
 Pastille, type of candy or medicinal pill 
 Postel, surname